Yesterday Once More is a 2004 Hong Kong romantic comedy caper film produced and directed by Johnnie To and starring Andy Lau and Sammi Cheng.

Plot
Andy Lau and Sammi Cheng star as Mr. and Mrs. Thief, a husband and wife team of super-thieves. After a successful diamond robbery, the two get into an argument about how the loot should be split up and the husband leaves.

Two years later, Mrs Thief is on the verge of remarrying although her affections lie more with the expensive necklace belonging to her fiancé's mother-in-law than with the husband to be. When a plot to steal the necklace ends up falling into the hands of Mr. Thief, the couple are forced together again.

Cast
Andy Lau as Mr. Thief
Sammi Cheng as Mrs. Thief
Jenny Hu as Mrs. Allen
Carl Ng as Steve
Gordon Lam as Insurance surveyor
Chun Wong as Private investigator
Benz Hui as Private investigator
Teddy Lin as Police detective
Courtney Wu as Wine cellar owner
Yu Ngai-ho as Lawyer
Hon Ping as Hired thief/Runner
Kam Loi-kwan as Hired thief
Ronald Yan as Police detective
Li Shing-cheong as Doctor
Leung Pok-yan as Hired thief
Chiu Chi-sing

External links
 
 
 

2004 films
2004 romantic comedy-drama films
Hong Kong romantic comedy-drama films
Hong Kong heist films
2000s Cantonese-language films
Media Asia films
Milkyway Image films
Films directed by Johnnie To
Films set in Hong Kong
Films shot in Hong Kong
2000s heist films
2000s Hong Kong films